Kim Moo-Kyo (Hangul: 김무교, Hanja:  金戊校) (born August 27, 1975 in Gyeongju, Gyeongsangbuk-do, South Korea) is a former female table tennis player from South Korea.

External links

1975 births
Living people
South Korean female table tennis players
Table tennis players at the 1996 Summer Olympics
Table tennis players at the 2000 Summer Olympics
Olympic table tennis players of South Korea
Olympic bronze medalists for South Korea
Olympic medalists in table tennis
Medalists at the 2000 Summer Olympics
Universiade medalists in table tennis
Asian Games medalists in table tennis
Table tennis players at the 1994 Asian Games
Table tennis players at the 1998 Asian Games
Table tennis players at the 2002 Asian Games
Asian Games silver medalists for South Korea
Asian Games bronze medalists for South Korea
Medalists at the 1994 Asian Games
Medalists at the 1998 Asian Games
Medalists at the 2002 Asian Games
World Table Tennis Championships medalists
Universiade silver medalists for South Korea
People from Gyeongju
Sportspeople from North Gyeongsang Province